Robbie Victor Russo (born February 15, 1993) is an American professional ice hockey defenceman currently playing for the Utica Comets in the American Hockey League (AHL) while under contract to the New Jersey Devils of the National Hockey League (NHL).

Russo was selected in the fourth round (95th overall) by the New York Islanders in the 2011 NHL Entry Draft.

Playing career

Amateur
Russo played for the USA Hockey National Team Development Program during the 2009–10 and 2010–11 seasons. As a member of the USA Under-17 team in 2009–10, Russo recorded seven goals and 24 assists in 52 games. As a member of the USA Under-18 team in 2010–11, Russo served as team captain, where he ranked sixth in team scoring with four goals and 26 assists in 60 games.

College
In 2011, Russo enrolled at the University of Notre Dame and skated four seasons with the NCAA Division I Fighting Irish men's ice hockey team. During his freshman season, Russo recorded four goals and 11 assists, in 40 games. Among CCHA rookies, Russo was tied for 15th in overall scoring and was the top freshmen defenseman in scoring with 15 points. He recorded his first career collegiate point with an assist on October 8, and recorded his first career collegiate goal on October 28, 2011. Following an outstanding rookie season, he was named to the 2011–12 CCHA All-Rookie Team, and named Notre Dame's rookie of the year.

During his sophomore season, he led Fighting Irish defensemen in scoring with five goals and 18 assists in 41 games, and was second among CCHA defensemen with 23 points. He was named the CCHA Gladiator defensive player of the week for the week ending November 19, 2012, after recording two goals and an assist in a two-game sweep against Michigan. That marked the first time since February 3–4, 1978 that the Irish had won a series at Yost Ice Arena. He helped lead Notre Dame to the 2013 CCHA Tournament championship.

During his junior season, Russo recorded four goals and 11 assists in 21 games, before being declared academically ineligible in January 2014. He was named to the Shillelagh Tournament All-Tournament Team.

During his senior season, Russo recorded 15 goals and 26 assists in 40 games. His 15 goals was tied for first, along with Joey LaLeggia, among all defenseman in goals scored, while his 41 points was ranked second, one point shy of Mike Reilly for the national league among all defenseman. Russo's 41 points were the most by a Hockey East defenseman since at least the 2000–01 season. Russo was named the Hockey East Defensive Player of the Week for the week ending December 8, 2014. He was named to the Florida College Hockey Classic All-Tournament Team, after blocking four shots, and posting a +3 plus-minus during the tournament.

On January 18, 2015, Russo recorded the only hat-trick in the nation by a defenseman, becoming the first Notre Dame defenseman to do so since Frank O'Brien on February 20, 1988. Russo was named the Hockey East Player of the Week for the week ending January 19, 2015. On February 12, 2015, he was named a team captain. Following an outstanding senior season, Russo was named to the 2014–15 Hockey East First All-Star Team, the East Second-Team All-American, and CCM Hockey All-American. Russo became the fifth Notre Dame defenseman to earn All-America honors and the first since Ian Cole in 2009.

Professional
On August 16, 2015, Russo signed a two-year entry level contract with the Detroit Red Wings. Russo was named the CCM/AHL Player of the Week for the week ending February 28, 2016. Russo recorded two goals and five assists, along with a plus-8 rating as the Grand Rapids Griffins finished the week a perfect 4–0. He became the second Griffins defenseman ever to earn the player of the week honor, following Clay Wilson on December 26, 2005.

During the 2015–16 season, Russo recorded five goals and 34 assists in 65 games for the Griffins, while posting a league-leading plus-47 rating that is tied for the highest mark by an AHL player since 1993. Following an outstanding rookie season, he was named to the 2015–16 AHL All-Rookie Team, and the AHL Second All-Star Team.

On March 6, 2017, Russo was recalled by the Detroit Red Wings. He made his NHL debut the following evening, on March 7, in a game against the Toronto Maple Leafs. Prior to being recalled, Russo recorded seven goals and 24 assists in 56 games for the Griffins. Following the conclusion of the Red Wings season, Russo was assigned to the Griffins. Russo appeared in 19 games for the Red Wings, averaging 16:04 time on ice and recording 18 shots on goal, 24 hits and 13 blocked shots. On September 5, 2017, the Red Wings signed Russo to a two-year contract extension.

On June 24, 2018, the Red Wings traded Russo to the Arizona Coyotes in exchange for a conditional seventh-round draft pick in the 2019 NHL Entry Draft. He spent the entirety of the 2018–19 season with the Coyotes' American League affiliate, the Tucson Roadrunners.

On June 5, 2019, the Coyotes re-signed Russo to a one-year, two-way contract extension.

Following two seasons within the Coyotes organization, Russo left the club as a free agent leading into the pandemic delayed 2020–21 season. Unable to secure a NHL contract, Russo agreed to a professional tryout deal with the San Jose Barracuda of the AHL on January 14, 2021. In the shortened 2020–21 season, Russo contributed with 2 goals and 15 points through 34 regular season games.

As a free agent following his stint with the Barracuda, Russo secured a NHL contract in agreeing to a two-year, two-way contract with the New Jersey Devils on July 29, 2021.

International play

Russo represented the United States at the 2011 IIHF U18 Championships, where he was captain, and helped lead his team to a gold medal. He recorded one goal and seven assists in six games, including setting up the overtime game-winning goal in the gold medal game against Sweden. He was named one of Team USA's top three players of the tournament.

Career statistics

Regular season and playoffs

International

Awards and honors

References

External links 
 

1993 births
Living people
American men's ice hockey defensemen
Detroit Red Wings players
Ice hockey players from Illinois
Grand Rapids Griffins players
New York Islanders draft picks
Notre Dame Fighting Irish men's ice hockey players
People from Westmont, Illinois
San Jose Barracuda players
Tucson Roadrunners players
USA Hockey National Team Development Program players
Utica Comets players
AHCA Division I men's ice hockey All-Americans